Lavinia Tagane-Kanimoa (born ~) is a Wallisian politician and member of the Territorial Assembly of Wallis and Futuna.

Tagane-Kanimoa was born in Wallis and is the daughter of a former member of the Territorial Assembly. After completing high school she studied in France, completing a diploma in marketing at Châtellerault and then a touris degree and a masters in commerce in Bordeaux. After working in France in the e-commerce sector, she returned to Wallis.

She was first elected to the Territorial Assembly in the 2017 Wallis and Futuna Territorial Assembly election, where she ran on a youth platform. In 2017 she also served as alternate to French National Assembly member Napole Polutele. She was re-elected to the Territorial Assembly at the 2022 election.

In 2018 she was appointed to the jury of the International Oceanian Documentary Film Festival.

References

Living people
Wallis and Futuna politicians
Wallis and Futuna women in politics
Members of the Territorial Assembly of Wallis and Futuna
Year of birth missing (living people)